PSR J0538+2817 is a pulsar situated in the constellation of Taurus. Discovered in 1996, it stirred interest from the fact that it is physically linked to the supernova remnant SNR G180.8–02.2.

The characteristic age of PSR J0538+2817 gives an older estimate: 618,000 years. However, observation of the pulsar's proper motion gives a much younger result: 30,000 ± years, meaning that the pulsar must have begun rotating at a relatively slow pace, at 139 milliseconds.

References

Taurus (constellation)
Pulsars